Lofta is a small village on the island of Öland, Sweden. It belongs to the municipality of Borgholm, in Kalmar County.

Populated places in Borgholm Municipality